Coon Hollow may refer to:

Coon Hollow (Laclede County, Missouri)
Coon Hollow (Washington County, Missouri)